Sydney Rae Cressida White (born 30 November 1991) is an English actress, best known for playing the role of "Erin Noble" in series 3 and 4 of the CBBC drama series Young Dracula. White grew up in West London with her parents and her four brothers, Paul, Adam, Cameron and Spike. She began acting professionally at the age of 10, and shortly after began attending the Sylvia Young Theatre School in London.

White co-formed a band called the Wild Things alongside her brother, Cameron White, and her husband Rob Kendrick. Their songs have been published on SoundCloud and Spotify, including their debut single 'Tell Me Why'. Sydney also recorded and released a song for download separately from The Wild Things, with her Young Dracula co-star Gerran Howell, entitled 'Sun Goes Down'.

Filmography

References

External links

1991 births
Living people
English television actresses
English women singer-songwriters
Musicians from London
Actresses from London
English child actresses
Alumni of the Sylvia Young Theatre School
21st-century English singers
21st-century English actresses